Raymond J. McGuire (born January 23, 1957) is an American businessman and political candidate who worked as an executive at Citigroup. McGuire was an unsuccessful candidate in the 2021 New York City Democratic mayoral primary.

Early life and education 
McGuire was born in Dayton, Ohio and raised by his mother and grandparents. Through scholarships, he attended the Hotchkiss School in Lakeville, Connecticut. He then graduated with a B.A. from Harvard College in 1979. McGuire attended the University of Nice in France on a Rotary Fellowship in 1980. In 1984, he received an M.B.A. from Harvard Business School and a Juris Doctor from Harvard Law School.

Career 
McGuire began working in finance in 1982 at First Boston. He was one of the original members of Wasserstein Perella & Co., Inc., and worked at Merrill Lynch & Co., Inc. He spent several years at Morgan Stanley before moving to Citigroup in 2005, where he worked as the global co-head of investment banking.

Prior to announcing his candidacy for mayor, McGuire was one of the highest-ranking and longest-serving African American business executives on Wall Street. McGuire was also named as a candidate to serve as the president of the Federal Reserve Bank of New York, but the job went to John C. Williams. During his tenure at Citigroup, McGuire has served as a business advisor for the Time Warner Cable split, ConocoPhillips' acquisition of Burlington Resources, Koch Industries' acquisition of Georgia-Pacific, the sale of Electronic Data Systems to Hewlett-Packard, and others.

An art collector, McGuire is the chairman of the Studio Museum in Harlem. He was a bundler to Barack Obama's presidential campaigns, and mentioned as a possible candidate for a position in the U.S. Department of the Treasury in 2013.

2021 mayoral election 

In October 2020, McGuire announced he would run for Mayor of New York City in 2021. Valerie Jarrett was announced to serve as a co-chair of McGuire's campaign. McGuire has pledged to focus his campaign on racial unrest amid the George Floyd protests and economic recovery from the COVID-19 pandemic.

Three months after beginning his campaign, McGuire had raised $5 million with notable contributions from the business community.

In a May 2021 interview with The New York Times, McGuire greatly underestimated the median cost of a home in Brooklyn. Nicole Gelinas, a senior fellow at the Manhattan Institute, characterized his estimate as being "out of touch with what’s going on in the city."

McGuire ultimately finished in seventh place, with 2.3% of the vote.

Personal life 
McGuire's wife, Crystal McCrary McGuire, is a television producer and novelist. She has three children—one with McGuire and two from a previous marriage.  McGuire has two step-children, including Cole Anthony, a National Basketball Association (NBA) player for the Orlando Magic and the son of Greg Anthony.

References

Bibliography
Paterson, David “Black, Blind, & In Charge: A Story of Visionary Leadership and Overcoming Adversity.” New York, New York, 2020

Living people
1957 births
People from Dayton, Ohio
Hotchkiss School alumni
Harvard Law School alumni
Harvard Business School alumni
New York (state) Democrats
Candidates in the 2021 United States elections
Businesspeople from New York (state)
African-American business executives
Citigroup people
21st-century African-American politicians
21st-century American politicians
20th-century African-American people
Harvard College alumni